Melissa Caroline Skala is an American biomedical engineer who is a professor at the Morgridge Institute for Research. Her research considers photonics-based technologies for personalised medical therapies. She is a Fellow of The Optical Society, SPIE and American Institute for Medical and Biological Engineering.

Early life and education 
As a child, Skala wanted to be an astronaut. She eventually studied physics at undergraduate at Washington State University, and during a summer research programme in biomedical optics decided to switch her attention to the emerging field of biomedical engineering. Skala graduated with a master's degree in biomedical engineering from the University of Wisconsin–Madison in 2004. Skala was a graduate student at Duke University, where she developed fluorescence-lifetime imaging microscopy (FLIM) for the diagnosis of neoplasia. After graduating, Skala was made a postdoctoral research fellow at Duke University.

Research and career 
In 2010 Skala was appointed an assistant professor at Vanderbilt University. She spent six years at Vanderbilt before joining the University of Wisconsin–Madison in 2016. Skala is Director of the Morgridge Institute for Research Optical Microscopy in Medicine Lab. Her research makes use of photonics-based technologies to monitor the function and interaction of immune cells. In particular, Skala develops new treatments for cancer patients through the use of biopsies and autofluorescence. She has shown that non-invasive, label-free fluorescence imaging can search through a patient's T cells, identify which might be the most useful for immunotherapy.

She has specialised in the treatment of pancreatic cancer, taking biopsies from tumours and creating organoids for laboratory-based investigations. These organoids are optically accessible, meaning Skala can evaluate the efficacy of different drugs and identify the optimised treatment regimes for specific patients. Skala makes use of optical coherence tomography as an imaging tool during brain surgery and in the treatment of liver cancer.

Alongside personalised treatment regimes, Skala has studied disparities in pancreatic cancer treatment, and whether ethnicity, location and insurance coverage impacts health outcomes. She has shown that women, Black and Asian patients are less likely receive medical treatment than their white male counterparts. Skala has developed organ-on-a-chip devices to study pulsatile flow and how it impacts cardiovascular disease. She is particularly interested in better understanding the irregularities in endothelial cells that occur in babies with heart defects.

Awards and honours 

 2016 National Science Foundation CAREER Award
2018 UW Carbone Cancer Center Ride Scholar
 2018 Wisconsin Alumni Research Foundation
 2019 Elected Fellow of The Optical Society
 2019 Elected Fellow of SPIE
 2019 Elected Fellow of American Institute for Medical and Biological Engineering

Selected publications

References 

American biomedical engineers
Washington State University alumni
University of Wisconsin–Madison College of Engineering alumni
Duke University alumni
Year of birth missing (living people)
American women scientists
Living people